Abbotts may refer to:

People 
 George Abbotts (1602–1645), English politician
 John Abbotts (1924–2008), English footballer
 Robin Hodgson, Baron Hodgson of Astley Abbotts (born 1942), British Conservative Party politician and life peer
 William Abbotts (1736–1805), one of the founding fathers of the British town of Leamington Spa

Places 
 Abbotts, a common part of many village names:
 Abbotts Ann, a village in Hampshire, England
 Abbotts Barton, a village in Hampshire, England
 Aston Abbotts, a village in Buckinghamshire, England
 Astley Abbotts, a village in Shropshire, England
 Brampton Abbotts, a village in Herefordshire, England
 Stanstead Abbotts, a village in Hertfordshire, England
 Stapleford Abbotts, a village in Essex, England
 Thorpe Abbotts, a village in Norfolk, England
 Abbotts, Western Australia, an abandoned town in Western Australia
 Abbotts Ann Down, a hamlet in Hampshire, England
 Abbotts Cove, a settlement in Newfoundland and Labrador
 Abbotts Creek Township, Forsyth County, North Carolina, United States
 Cotton Abbotts, a former civil parish in Cheshire, England

Other uses 
 Abbotts Colleges, South Africa
 Abbotts Creek, North Carolina, a river in the US
 Abbotts Hall Farm, Essex, England
 Abbotts Lagoon, California, United States
 Abbotts Moss Nature Reserve, Cheshire, England
 Inventing the Abbotts, 1997 American coming-of-age film
 Sompting Abbotts Preparatory School, a historic West Sussex independent school in Sompting, England